Sir Peter Edward Middleton  (born 23 April 1934) is a British UK Chairman of Marsh & McLennan Companies, former banker and former Chancellor of the University of Sheffield. He is currently on the board of the Philharmonia Orchestra.

Life
Middleton was born on 2 April 1934 in Sheffield. His father was Thomas Edward Middleton. He was educated at Sheffield City Grammar School and at the University of Sheffield where he gained a first class degree in economics in 1955 with further study at the University of Bristol. He lives in Kensington with his wife Connie.

Career

The Treasury
After National Service in the Royal Army Pay Corps, Sir Peter joined HM Treasury, ultimately ascending to become Permanent Secretary from 1983 to 1991.

Barclays Bank
Sir Peter joined Barclays in 1991 as Group Deputy Chairman and Executive Chairman of Barclays de Zoete Wedd (BZW). He became Chairman of Barclays Capital following the reorganisation of BZW in October 1997 and was appointed Barclays Group Chairman in April 1999. During this time he was also a board member of Bass PLC from 1992–2001 and General Accident (later CGU) from 1992-1995.
He was appointed chairman of the Barclays Group Asia Pacific Advisory Committee in 2004.

CEDR
Sir Peter Middleton was appointed CEDR Chairman in September 2004 following his retirement as Group Chairman of Barclays.

Other
He was appointed UK chairman, Marsh & McLennan Companies in 2007, chairman of Marsh Ltd in 2005, chairman of Mercer Ltd in 2009.  He is chairman of Burford Capital and Hamilton Ventures since 2009.  He was deputy chairman of United Utilities from 1994–2007, he is Chairman of Creative Sheffield (2005 -)(previously Sheffield Urban Regeneration Company  2000-2005(Sheffield One). He is a senior partner of Fenchurch Advisory Partners (since 2005); He was on the board of the National Institute of Economic and Social Research from 1996-2007. He is a governor of the Ditchley Foundation. He was President of the British Bankers' Association from 2004-06 (BBA). and was Chairman of Camelot Group plc from 2004 - 2010.  He was a member of the IAP of the International Monetary Authority of Singapore from 2004-2006.
He is a Member of the Court of the Worshipful Company of International Bankers (Master in 2006/7) and a member of the Board of Patrons of the European Association for Banking and Financial History e.V.

Honours
Middleton took on the role of Chancellor of the University of Sheffield on 9 October 1999.  He has also been a visiting fellow at Nuffield College, Oxford.  He was knighted KCB in 1984 and GCB in 1989.

References

1934 births
Living people
People educated at The City School, Sheffield
Alumni of the University of Sheffield
Alumni of the University of Bristol
Knights Grand Cross of the Order of the Bath
Chairmen of Barclays
Royal Army Pay Corps soldiers
20th-century British Army personnel